Where Is the Body, Moeller? is a 1971 Danish comedy film directed by Preben Kaas and starring Dirch Passer.

Cast
 Dirch Passer as Vilhelm Hårlung
 Preben Kaas as Møller
 Sisse Reingaard as Helle Berg
 Jean Squerent as Purser
 Jack Weiss as Gangster
 Johnnie Christen as Sagfører
 Anne Mari Lie as Miss Dean
 Henry Voersaa as Journalist
 Joseph Cordon as Advokat

References

External links

1971 films
1971 comedy films
Danish comedy films
1970s Danish-language films